The 1907 Indiana Hoosiers football team was an American football team that represented Indiana University Bloomington during the 1907 college football season. In their third season under head coach James M. Sheldon, the Hoosiers compiled a 4–2 record, finished in a tie for last place in the Big Nine Conference, and outscored their opponents by a combined total of 85 to 57.

Schedule

References

Indiana
Indiana Hoosiers football seasons
Indiana Hoosiers football